Rubicon was a New Zealand pop punk band best known for their singles "Bruce" and "Funny Boy" from the early 2000s.

History 

Rubicon was formed in Auckland in 1999 by drummer, bassist and singer Paul Reid. He had previously drummed with Loves Ugly Children and The D4 and also played Marshall Heywood on New Zealand television soap Shortland Street. Reid was joined by his school friends: guitarist and vocalist Gene Bennett and bassist and drummer Jon Corker. The trio first gained attention with their song "California", which had come second in a demo competition held by Auckland radio station 96.1. This led to the band signing with Wildside Records, including distribution in New Zealand, Australia and Japan.

The band released single "Funny Boy" in 2001, which reached #46 in the New Zealand charts, followed by single "Bruce" in 2002, which charted at #22. The band's debut album Primary was released in 2002, charting at #16. Rubicon received 10 NZ On Air grants of $5000 for the production of music videos and a $50,000 grant for the recording of Primary.

In 2004 Bennet and Corker left the band to pursue their own musical directions, with Reid relocating to Los Angeles. New York musicians Scott Zant and Frank Zumo joined the band, with a new line-up of Zant on bass and vocals, Zumo on drums and Reid on guitar and vocals. In 2005 the band released their second album The Way It Was Meant To Be, but it did not experience the same popularity as Primary.

By 2006 Rubicon had broken up, with Reid having returned to New Zealand and launched a now defunct web directory similar to Craigslist called The Thing. As of 2012, Reid is the managing director of Auckland real estate company Iconicity, later renamed The Icon Group.

Discography

Albums

Singles

References

External links
Rubicon at Muzic.net.nz
Rubicon at Amplifier

New Zealand punk rock groups
Pop punk groups